"Moodswings (To Come at Me like That)" is Welsh singer-songwriter Charlotte Church's fourth and final single from her fifth studio album, Tissues and Issues (2005). "Moodswings" reached number 14 on the UK Singles Chart in March 2006.

Music video
The video was directed by production team Harvey & Carolyn who previously directed the music video for "Biology" by Girls Aloud and the similarities in effects and costumes can clearly be seen. The video features Church in different settings and poses. During the scenes, Church's clothes change on her at regular and close intervals, and sometimes she even seems to change "form" altogether; for example, she at one point changes into a child. When only her face is seen, she is given different make-up and glasses, and also make-up which seems to imply injury. She is seen in one scene to walk from different places into the same room holding a sign above her head, which shows the lyrics.

Track listings
CD single

UK digital download 1

UK digital download 2

Charts

References

2006 singles
Charlotte Church songs
Songs written by Kalenna Harper